The 2014 Supertaça Cândido de Oliveira was the 36th edition of the Supertaça Cândido de Oliveira. It featured the winners of the 2013–14 Primeira Liga and 2013–14 Taça de Portugal, S.L. Benfica, and the runners-up of the Taça de Portugal, Rio Ave F.C. The two clubs also met in the 2014 Taça da Liga Final, also won by Benfica.

Benfica featured in their 16th Super Cup and Rio Ave played in the fixture for the first time.

The game finished goalless after extra time, and Benfica won 3–2 on penalties for their fifth Supertaça victory, achieving a Portuguese record of all four domestic titles won in a year.

Background
Benfica's last appearance was in 2010, where the Portuguese champions lost to 2009–10 Taça de Portugal holders Porto 2–0, also at the Estádio Municipal de Aveiro. In 15 Supertaça appearances prior to 2014, Benfica won 4, in 1980, 1985, 1989 and 2005. Rio Ave made their first Supertaça appearance.

In Benfica's and Rio Ave's entire history, the two teams had met on 47 different occasions. Benfica had obtained 35 victories, while Rio Ave had won 3 times, with 9 encounters ending in a draw. Before the Supertaça, the last meeting between both sides was in the domestic cup final, on 18 May 2014, with Benfica defeating Rio Ave 1–0 at the Estádio do Jamor. A first-half strike from Argentine winger Nicolás Gaitán granted Benfica a 25th cup trophy which would cap off a treble-winning season for the club.

Match

Details

Broadcasting
Once again, RTP broadcast the Supertaça on television and radio (RTP1 and Antena 1, respectively), doing it for the fourth consecutive year. As in previous years, an HD broadcast was available on 1080i resolution on RTP HD, which was available on most pay-TV providers.

References

Supertaça Cândido de Oliveira
S.L. Benfica matches
Rio Ave F.C. matches
2014–15 in Portuguese football
Sport in Aveiro, Portugal
Association football penalty shoot-outs